Tearcoat Creek is a stream in Clinton County, Kentucky, in the United States.

According to tradition, Tearcoat Creek was so named when a young girl tore her coat while escaping a bear.

See also
List of rivers of Kentucky

References

Rivers of Clinton County, Kentucky
Rivers of Kentucky